Great Britain women's national softball team is the national team for Great Britain. The team competed at the 1994 ISF Women's World Championship where they finished twenty-third.  The team competed at the 2006 ISF Women's World Championship where they finished tenth. The team competed at the 2010 ISF Women's World Championship where they finished eleventh. The team competed at the 2022 Women's Softball European Championship where they won a silver medal.

Medal record

References

External links 
 International Softball Federation

Softball
Women's national softball teams
Softball in the United Kingdom